Aikaterini Hadjipateras (born 9 April 1957), known professionally as Kathryn Hunter, is an American-born British actress and theatre director, known for her appearances as Arabella Figg in the Harry Potter film series, Eedy Karn on the Disney+ Star Wars spinoff series Andor, and as the Three Witches in Joel Coen’s The Tragedy of Macbeth.

Hunter was born in New York to Greek parents, and was raised in England. She trained at RADA where she is now an associate, and regularly directs student productions.

Career

Stage work
In her stage work, Hunter is particularly associated with physical theatre, having been described as a "virtuoso physical performer."

She has worked with renowned companies in that field including Shared Experience and Complicité. She won an Olivier Award in 1991 for playing the millionairess in Friedrich Dürrenmatt's The Visit.

Critics have noted Hunter's unusual physical presence and her range. Charles Spencer of The Telegraph wrote, "diminutive in stature, and slightly lame, she has a deep, guttural voice, eyes like black olives and the most expressive of faces. Almost nothing seems beyond her range, from farcical clowning to deepest, darkest tragedy."

Kathryn Hunter's "uncommon ability to shape-shift" has led her to play roles typically reserved for male actors. She was the first British woman to play King Lear professionally. 

Hunter's portrayal of Lear conscientiously challenged the audience to separate character and performer: her voice and clothing read as male, but she physicalized lines such as "Down from the waist they are Centaurs/Though women all above" to remind the audience of the female body playing the part. Another male role she played was in The Bee, directed by Hideki Noda, which played at the Soho Theatre in June 2006 and 2012.

Hunter has also played animals and other creatures. In Kafka's Monkey, a solo piece based on Franz Kafka's "A Report to an Academy," she played a monkey delivering a speech to a scientific society about its transformation from a monkey to a man. The piece was a highly acclaimed sell-out success at the Young Vic in 2009, where it was reprised in May 2011. It toured to the Baryshnikov Arts Center in New York in April 2013. According to Charles Isherwood of the New York Times, Hunter's performance had "wry wisdom, a touch of cheeky humor and, above all, a sense of dignity."

In November 2013, she co-starred as the fairy Puck in Julie Taymor's production of A Midsummer Night's Dream, the show that opened the Theatre for a New Audience in Brooklyn. Ben Brantley of the New York Times described Hunter's Puck as "genuinely original" and "part music-hall comedian, part fairground contortionist."

In 2008, Hunter co-starred in the first English-language production of Fragments, a collection of short plays by Samuel Beckett, directed by Peter Brook. Of the London run at the Young Vic, Andrew Dickson of The Guardian wrote, "the evening belongs to Kathryn Hunter, who crams into a few minutes of stage time more than most actors achieve in a career." The piece toured internationally, appearing in New York in 2011.

Hunter was made an Artistic Associate at the Royal Shakespeare Company (RSC) in 2008.

From January to March 2009, she debuted as an RSC director with a production of Othello at the Warwick Arts Centre, Hackney Empire, Northern Stage, Oxford Playhouse and Liverpool Playhouse. Her husband Marcello Magni was movement director on the production and appeared in it as Roderigo. Other cast members included Michael Gould as Iago, Patrice Naiambana as Othello, and Natalia Tena as Desdemona.

In 2010, Hunter played Cleopatra in a production of Antony and Cleopatra and the Fool in a production of King Lear at the Royal Shakespeare Company's Courtyard Theatre in Stratford-upon-Avon. The latter performance was described as "outstanding".

In January 2011, she withdrew from these roles shortly before the plays were due to be revived.

In February 2016, Hunter took the title role of Cyrano de Bergerac at the Southwark Playhouse, London. Guardian critic Michael Billington wrote, "Hunter is an astonishing shape-shifting performer who can play just about anything" but Telegraph critic Jane Schilling called Rusell Bolam's production "an opportunity squandered." In 2017 she starred in the title role in The House of Bernarda Alba at the Royal Exchange, Manchester.

In 2018, Hunter returned to the Royal Shakespeare Company to play the title role in Timon of Athens, directed by Simon Godwin.

From December 2022 to June 2023, Hunter is playing the lead role of Janina Duszejko in a stage adaptation of the Polish mystery novel Drive Your Plow Over the Bones of the Dead, adapted for the stage by Complicité.

TV and film
Her screen work includes a supporting role in the TV series Rome as Cleopatra's companion, Charmian, and voicing Gorn in Tron: Uprising. Notable film work includes Mike Leigh's All or Nothing (2002) and Harry Potter's neighbour, Arabella Figg, in the fifth movie of the Harry Potter series, Harry Potter and the Order of the Phoenix (2007). A 2001 episode of Silent Witness entitled "Faith" (BBC), Hunter played the role of Sister Geraldine Catterson. In 2018 she starred in the BBC Two drama Black Earth Rising as Capi Petridis, the Prosecutor of the International Criminal Court. In 2021, she earned acclaim in her portrayal of the Three Witches in Joel Coen's The Tragedy of Macbeth, and for her performance was awarded the New York Film Critics Circle Award for Best Supporting Actress.

Personal life
Hunter was married to Marcello Magni, co-founder of Complicité, until his death in 2022.

Filmography

Film

Television

References

External links
 

1957 births
English film actresses
English television actresses
English stage actresses
English Shakespearean actresses
English people of Greek descent
Royal Shakespeare Company members
Alumni of RADA
Laurence Olivier Award winners
English theatre directors
Living people
Actresses from New York City
American emigrants to England
American theatre directors
Women theatre directors
American people of Greek descent
20th-century English actresses
21st-century English actresses